Morten Lyngstad Bjørshol  (born 22 August 1997) is a Norwegian professional footballer who plays as a defender for USL Championship side Orange County SC.

Career

Youth
Bjørshol played with the academy team at Stabæk until 2014. He subsequently joined Lyn, who he played with for three seasons.

College 
In 2017, Bjørshol opted to move to the United States to play college soccer at California State University, Los Angeles. In four seasons with the Golden Eagles, with the 2020 season cancelled due to the COVID-19 pandemic, Bjørshol made 85 appearances, scoring 12 goals and tallying five assists. At college, Bjørshol earned numerous accolades; earning All-Conference honors every year, All-American honors for his last three seasons, and was named the CCAA Defender of the Year in 2019. He helped the team to consecutive tournament titles in 2017 and 2018

Professional
On 13 March 2022, signed with USL Championship side Las Vegas Lights. He made his debut for Las Vegas on 19 March 2022, starting against Phoenix Rising.

On March 7, 2023, Bjørshol signed with USL Championship side Orange County SC for their 2023 season.

References

External links
Golden Eagles bio

1997 births
Association football defenders
Cal State Los Angeles Golden Eagles men's soccer players
Expatriate soccer players in the United States
Footballers from Oslo
Las Vegas Lights FC players
Living people
Lyn Fotball players
Norwegian Second Division players
Norwegian expatriate footballers
Norwegian expatriate sportspeople in the United States
Norwegian footballers
Orange County SC players
Stabæk Fotball players
USL Championship players